Legnica Airport in Poland serves the town of Legnica (106,000 inhabitants, 500,000 nearby Okręg Miedziowy/ Copper Basin conurbation of Legnica, Głogów, Lubin and Polkowice). It is a former military airport (runway length 1600 m, width 40 m) located in the town centre. Expansion would be a costly proposition since a nearby railway line would need to be rerouted into an underground tunnel, and even after that because of the short runway the airfield would only be really useful as a city airport, akin to Mannheim Airport or London City Airport.

History
Before World War II, the airport operated as a hub for Zeppelins. After the war, it was taken over by the Soviet Armed Forces (its Northern Group of Forces) and used for military purposes until the early 1990s.

Airport infrastructure
There is a railroad line near the terminal that can be used for passenger service.

References

External links
 Official website
 Legnica airport flight arrivals

Defunct airports in Poland
Buildings and structures in Legnica